VA3, VA-3, or VA 3 may refer to:

 Jetta VA3, a German-Chinese compact sedan
 NEC PC-88 VA3, an 8-bit home computer
 Virginia State Route 3
 Virginia's 3rd congressional district